Clifton S. "Cliff" Sunada (born May 18, 1971 in Honolulu, Hawaii) is a retired male judoka from the United States.

Sunada claimed the silver medal in the Men's Flyweight (– 56 kg) division at the 1991 Pan American Games in Havana, Cuba. In the final he was defeated by Puerto Rico's Luis Martínez. He represented his native country at the 1996 Summer Olympics in Atlanta, Georgia.

External links
 
 

1971 births
Living people
American male judoka
Judoka at the 1996 Summer Olympics
Olympic judoka of the United States
Sportspeople from Honolulu
Pan American Games silver medalists for the United States
Pan American Games medalists in judo
Goodwill Games medalists in judo
Judoka at the 1991 Pan American Games
Competitors at the 1994 Goodwill Games
Medalists at the 1991 Pan American Games
20th-century American people